The Werner Plan (or Werner Report) was drawn up by a working group chaired by Pierre Werner, Luxembourg's Prime Minister and Minister for Finances, and presented in October 1970. It was conducted after the European Summit in The Hague in 1969, where the Heads of State and Government of the European Community agreed to prepare a plan for economic and monetary union.

The three stage plan proposed gradual, institutional reform leading to the irrevocable fixing of exchange rates and the adoption of a single currency within a decade, but it did not recommend the establishment of a central bank. The plan was never implemented because of pressure of the United States (France retired its support after a France-US meeting in the Azores at the end of 1971).

There are several references to "the transfer of responsibility from the national authorities to Community authorities".

Footnotes

External links 

 Report to the Council and the Commission on the realization by stages of economic and monetary union in the Community, Luxembourg, 8 October 1970 (Werner Report)
 A rereading of the Werner Report of 8 October 1970 in the light of the Pierre Werner family archives on CVCE.eu 
 Pierre Werner lecture on BCL.lu - Banque centrale du Luxembourg
 Report to the Council and the Commission on the realization by stage

History of the European Union
Monetary policy of the European Union
1970 in the European Economic Community